Bartolomé Alarcón (born 19 March 1963) is a Spanish rower. He competed in the men's coxless four event at the 1988 Summer Olympics.

References

External links

1963 births
Living people
Spanish male rowers
Olympic rowers of Spain
Rowers at the 1988 Summer Olympics